Common names: mountain pit vipers.
Ovophis is a genus of venomous pitvipers found in Asia. Six species are currently recognized.

Geographic range
Found in Asia in Nepal and Seven Sisters (Assam), India, eastward through Myanmar, Cambodia, Thailand, Laos, Vietnam, West Malaysia, Taiwan, Okinawa, Sumatra and Borneo.

Species

*) Not including the nominate subspecies.
T) Type species.

Taxonomy
Species placed in this group have long been associated with the genus Trimeresurus. One other species that is included in some other taxonomies is O. tonkinensis (Bourret, 1934). It is commonly called the Tonkin pit viper and is found in Vietnam and China.

References

External links

 

Crotalinae
Snake genera